Handsworth Revolution is the debut album by British reggae band Steel Pulse. It is named after the Handsworth district of Birmingham, England, the band's home district to which the album was dedicated.

The first Steel Pulse single for Island Records, "Ku Klux Klan" (a call for resistance against forces of racism) was released in February 1978. Five months later, their debut album was released to critical acclaim. Handsworth Revolution was produced by Karl Pitterson, who had worked with Bob Marley, Bunny Wailer and Peter Tosh. The album reached #9 on the British charts ten days after its release. The band would soon support Bob Marley & The Wailers on a 12-date European tour in June and July 1978, including concerts in Paris, Ibiza, Gothenburg, Stockholm, Oslo, Rotterdam, Amsterdam and Brussels. The tour kicked off with an outdoor festival at the New Bingley Hall in Stafford. David Hinds recalls:

We learned a lot of discipline on that tour that rubbed off - rehearsal, execution on stage, how to tour, stability [...] that's when the doors really started to open for us. It has always been one of the most memorable moments of my career. To play as part of that package exposed Steel Pulse to audiences that literally were in awe of our message. Of course, being formally introduced through Bob Marley helped us tremendously. Playing for audiences, especially those in Paris who saw the force of Steel Pulse and the force of Bob Marley play on the same bill, enabled us to sell out shows every time since then.

Steel Pulse headlined its own tour in 1978 and released two more singles from the album: "Prodigal Son" and "Prediction." Mykaell Riley left the band because of musical differences and went on to success with the Reggae Philharmonic Orchestra and as producer for a number of top artists and TV themes. His departure propelled Hinds into the spotlight and in an attempt to draw a stronger black audience, the group adopted the banner of the Rastafari movement. Appearances on television included mainstream shows like Top of the Pops and Rock Goes to College. At one of their 'Rock Against Racism' appearances, in Victoria Park, East London in April 1978, more than 80,000 people watched a concert that also included The Clash, Tom Robinson Band and X-Ray Spex.

A live performance of the track "Macka Splaff" appeared on a 1978 Virgin Records compilation album called Live at the Electric Circus, alongside offerings by The Fall, Joy Division, Buzzcocks and John Cooper Clarke. Two of their tracks were also included in the film Reggae in Babylon that documented the reggae movement in the UK in 1978, alongside Aswad, Matumbi, Jimmy Lindsay and Alton Ellis.

Track listing
All songs written by David Hinds except as shown.
"Handsworth Revolution"
"Bad Man"
"Soldiers"
"Sound Check"
"Prodigal Son" (Basil Gabbidon, Ronald McQueen, Selwyn Brown, David Hinds, Alphonso Martin, Steve Nisbett, Mykaell Riley)
"Ku Klux Klan"
"Prediction"
"Macka Splaff" (Basil Gabbidon, Ronald McQueen, Selwyn Brown, David Hinds, Alphonso Martin, Steve Nisbett, Mykaell Riley)

Personnel
Steel Pulse
David Hinds - lead vocals
Alphonso Martin, Mykaell Riley - vocals, percussion
Basil Gabbidon - vocals, lead guitar
Ronald McQueen - bass, percussion
Selwyn Brown - keyboards, vocals, percussion
Steve Nisbett - drums
Technical
Steve Lillywhite, Godwin Logie - producers on "Ku Klux Klan"
Godwin Logie - engineer
Pete King - executive producer, management 
Andrew Aloof - cover illustration

References

Steel Pulse albums
1978 debut albums
Island Records albums